Elexa Marie Bahr Gutiérrez (born 26 May 1998) is a Colombian footballer who plays as a forward for Colombian Women's Football League club Deportivo Cali. Born in the United States to a Honduran father and a Colombian mother, she played for Honduras Under-20s before switching to play senior international football for Colombia.

Club career

High school and college career
Bahr attended Buford High School in her hometown and the University of South Carolina in Columbia, South Carolina.

Racing Féminas
In 2020, Bahr signed a professional contract with Spanish club Racing Féminas, which currently plays in the Segunda División Pro; the second level of league competition for Spanish women's football.

Deportivo Cali
Elexa Bahr was announced as a reinforcement for Deportivo Cali ahead of the 2022 Copa Libertadores Femenina on August 25, 2022. She debuted on September 17 against Olimpia in the friendly tournament, Copa Ídolas 2022, with a goal. Her team went on to win the tournament in the final against Atlético Mineiro which also included the hometown rival, América de Cali.

América de Cali
It was announced on January 25, 2023, that Bahr had signed for rivals América de Cali ahead of the 2023 season.

International career
Bahr was born in the United States to a Honduran father and a Colombian mother, which made her eligible to represent the United States, Honduras, and Colombia at international level.

Honduras U20
Bahr initially represented Honduras at the 2015 CONCACAF Women's U-20 Championship, where she scored three goals. Honduras ultimately failed to qualify for the 2016 FIFA U-20 Women's World Cup, following a 2–0 defeat to Mexico in the third-place play-off.

Colombia
She made her senior debut for Colombia on 23 October 2021 as an 87th-minute substitution in a 2–0 friendly home win over Chile. In November 2021, Bahr was called up for two friendlies against Uruguay; she was substituted on in both games as Colombia won 3–2 and 1–0, respectively.

During the first half of 2022, Bahr appeared in five friendlies in preparation for the 2022 Copa América Femenina. On 3 July 2022, Bahr was included in Nelson Abadía's final Colombia squad for the Copa América. She made her tournament debut during Colombia's opening match against Paraguay, coming on as a substitute for Mayra Ramírez as Colombia went on to win 4–2. Bahr was an unused substitute in the final against Brazil where Colombia finished as the tournament's runner-up after losing 0–1.

References

External links
Elexa Bahr at BDFútbol

1998 births
Living people
People with acquired Colombian citizenship
Colombian women's footballers
Women's association football forwards
CDE Racing Féminas players
Segunda Federación (women) players
Colombian expatriate women's footballers
Colombian expatriate sportspeople in Spain
Expatriate women's footballers in Spain
Colombia women's international footballers
Colombian people of Honduran descent
People with acquired Honduran citizenship
Honduran women's footballers
Honduran expatriate footballers
Honduran expatriate sportspeople in Spain
Honduran people of Colombian descent
People from Buford, Georgia
Sportspeople from the Atlanta metropolitan area
Soccer players from Georgia (U.S. state)
South Carolina Gamecocks women's soccer players